Six Nations may refer to:

 Peoples

 Iroquois Confederacy a group of First Nations/Native American peoples:  Mohawk, Oneida, Onondaga, Cayuga, Seneca, and Tuscarora
 Six Nations land cessions, in the late 17th and 18th centuries to British North America 
 Six Nations of the Grand River, First Nations reserve in Canada
 Six Nations Polytechnic, third-level college in the reserve
 Celtic League, alliance of six "Celtic nations" (Ireland, Scotland, Wales, Brittany, Cornwall, Isle of Man)

 Sports

 Six Nations Championship, an annual European rugby union competition involving England, Scotland, Wales, Ireland, France, and Italy
 Six Nations Under 20s Championship, under-20 equivalent
 Women's Six Nations Championship, women's equivalent
 Six Nations Tournament (ice hockey), a 1994–1996 European competition for clubs from Italy, Austria, France, Slovenia, Netherlands, and Denmark
 ICC Six Nations Challenge, a 2000–2004 cricket tournament for various teams below Test status.
 Nations Cup (netball), an annual tournament held in Singapore

See also
 Six-party talks, international discussions with an aim to find a peaceful resolution to security concerns resulting from the North Korean nuclear weapons program